Günther Theodor Niethammer (28 September 1908 Waldheim – 14 January 1974, Kottenforst) was a German ornithologist who served during the Second World War with the Nazi Waffen-SS at various places including the Auschwitz concentration camp where he conducted studies on birds.

Life and work 
Niethammer was born in Waldheim, the eighth son of Konrad Niethammer, a paper manufacturer (owner of Kübler & Niethammer paper mills) and politician. After studying zoology at Tübingen in 1927 he moved to Leipzig in 1929 and then worked on the anatomy of the avian crop under J. Meisenheimer. Through Hans Kummerlöwe, also in Leipzig, he met Erwin Stresemann who gave him the task of compiling the Handbuch der Deutschen Vogelkunde.  The publication of the first volume led to a position as a curator at the Museum Koenig in Bonn from 1937 and he continued to work on the remaining two volumes, the last published in 1942. In 1937, Niethammer joined the Nazi party (Number 5613683) and in early 1940 he volunteered with the Luftwaffe as he had a flying license. Due to his age, he was rejected and he then tried to join the Wehrmacht which also refused to admit him. He then joined the armed unit, Waffen-SS, in May 1940. He was posted to Oranienburg and shortly after to Auschwitz concentration camp where he was posted at gate G as a part of the security team. Opposite gate G was a gravel pit where prisoners were routinely killed. He made a request to the camp commander Rudolf Höss for alternate duty and towards March 1941 he was given "special ornithological duty" nearby and Niethammer published on the birdlife of the Auschwitz area. There were many fishponds around the area which had dykes that were made of ash from burned prisoners. Niethammer hunted ducks nearby which were shared with Höss and son Klaus. A prisoner named Grembocki helped in preparation of specimens.

From the end of 1941 he was appointed as a zoologist with the Wehrmacht Department of Science at the recommendation of Fritz von Wettstein. He took part in the Ahnenerbe to support Nazi racial theory research. In 1942 he was transferred to unit K led by Sturmbannführer Ernst Schäfer. By 1 May 1944 he was promoted to Obersturmführer and from 22 April to 8 May 1945 he served in combat operations with the 269th Infantry Division. When the Allied Forces took over the region, he fled in civilian clothes on a bicycle belonging to Richard Heyder (1884-1984). In early February 1946 he reported to the British 320th Field Security Section in Bonn and was arrested. Niethammer was sentenced to eight years of imprisonment but it was reviewed and reduced to three years. He was placed in Mokotów Prison in Warsaw and released in November 1949.

Niethammer became head of the ornithology department at the Museum Koenig in 1950 and became a professor in 1951 and retired in 1973 to Bonn. From 1962 to 1972 he served as editor for the Journal fur Ornithologie. He died of a heart failure while hunting on 14 January 1974. Niethammer's Nazi record was suppressed during his time in West Germany although known from his publications.

Arno Surminski based his 2008 novel Die Vogelwelt von Auschwitz upon Niethammer's ornithological studies around Auschwitz. Niethammer was married to Ruth née Filtzer and one of their four sons, Jochen became a mammalogist of repute. Several subspecies of birds have been named after him including:
Carpodacus rubicilla niethammeri Keve, 1943
Pogoniulus pusillus niethammeri Clancey, 1952
Carduelis cannabina guentheri Wolters, 1952
Calandrella rufescens niethammeri Kumerloeve, 1963
Garrulus glandarius hansguentheri Keve, 1967 (after Hans Kumerloeve and Niethammer)
Nothoprocta pentlandi niethammeri Koepcke, 1968
Mirafra angolensis niethammeri Da Rosa Pinto, 1968
Amandava subflava niethammeri Wolters, 1969
A genus of pyralid moth is named after him as Niethammeriodes.

References

External links 
 Commemorative Issue of Bonner zoologische Beiträge (in German, with portrait) 

1908 births
1974 deaths
German ornithologists
20th-century German zoologists
Journal of Ornithology editors
Auschwitz concentration camp personnel